Kuştepe is a village in the Adıyaman District, Adıyaman Province, Turkey. The village is populated by Kurds of the Reşwan tribe and had a population of 478 in 2021.

References 

Villages in Adıyaman District
Kurdish settlements in Adıyaman Province